This is a list of satirical television news programs with a satirical bent, or parodies of news broadcasts, with either real or fake stories for mainly humorous purposes. The list does not include sitcoms or other programs set in a news-broadcast work environment, such as the US Mary Tyler Moore, the UK's Drop The Dead Donkey, the Australian Frontline, or the Canadian The Newsroom.

Albania 
 Fiks Fare, first satirical and investigative TV show in Albania (2003–present)

Armenia 
 ArmComedy (2012–Present)

Australia 
 CNNNN (2002-2003)
 Frontline (Australian TV series) (1994-1997)
 The Late Report (1999)
 Newstopia (2007-2008)
 Rubbery Figures (1984-1990)
 Shaun Micallef's Mad as Hell (2012–Present)
 The Roast (2012-2014)
 The Weekly with Charlie Pickering (2015–Present)
 Tonightly with Tom Ballard (2017–2018)

Austria 
 Wilkommen Österreich

Belgium 
 Décodeurs de l'Info,  a satirical latex puppet show
 TVBelgiek,  a satirical latex puppet show
 Brussel Nieuwstraat
 De Ideale Wereld (2013–Present)

Brazil 
 Sensacionalista
 Furo MTV (2009–2013)
 Greg News (2017)

Bulgaria 
 Gospodari Na Efira (2003–Present)

Canada 
 100 Limites
 3600 secondes d'extase
 The Beaverton (2016–2019)
 Le Canal des nouvelles modifiées
 Et Dieu créa... Laflaque (2004–Present)
 La Fin du monde est à 7 heures (1997-2000)
 Le Fric Show (2006-2007)
 Le JourNul
 Infoman (2000-present)
 Méchante semaine
 Point Blank (2002)
 Rick Mercer Report (2004–2018)
 Taquinons la planète
 This Hour Has Seven Days (1964-1966)
 This Hour Has 22 Minutes (1993–Present)

Catalonia 
 Està passant (2017-Present)
 Polònia (2006-Present)

Chile 
 31 Minutos (2003-2014)

Czech Republic 
 Kancelář Blaník (2014–Present)

Denmark 
 Natholdet (2010–Present)
 Quizzen med Signe Molde

Egypt 
 Al Bernameg with Bassem Youssef (2011-2014)
 Joe Show  (2017-present)

 Finland 
 Noin viikon uutiset (2014–2017)
 Noin viikon studio (2018–2021 Cancelled. Last episode 11.3.2021)

 YLE is planning a new political + satiristic segment with earlier people.

 France 
 Groland Magazine Le Bébête Show (1982-1995)
 Le JTN Le Petit Journal de Yann Barthès (Actuality edition and People edition) (2004–2017)
 Les Guignols de l'info, a satirical latex puppet show
 Quotidien (2016-present)
 Rendez-vous avec Kevin Razy Germany 
 Rudis Tagesshow (de) (1981–1987)
 Die Wochenshow (1996–2002, 2011)
 Die Harald Schmidt Show (1995–2014)
 Freitag Nacht News (de) (1999–2006)
 Hurra Deutschland (1989–1991, 2003-2004),  a satirical latex puppet show
 heute-show (2009–present)
 Neo Magazin Royale (2013–2019)
 Die Anstalt (2014–present)
 Postillon24 (2014–present)
 extra 3 (1976–present)
ZDF Magazin Royale (2020–present)

 Greece 
 Radio Arvyla (2008–Present)
 Anaskopisi, thepressproject.gr  (2014–Present)

 Hong Kong 
  Headliner 頭條新聞 (RTHK) (1989–2020)

 Hungary 
 Heti Dörgés Villám Gézával (2019)

 India 
 The Week That Wasn't (2006–present)
 The great Indian Tamasha News Laundry On Air With AIB Lete Hain Khabar With Varun Badola Iraq 
 Albasheer Show (2014-Present)

Ireland
 Hall's Pictorial Weekly (1971–1980)

 Israel 
 Chartzufim (1996-2001)
 Eretz Nehederet (2003–Present)
Gav HaUma (formerly Matzav HaUma) (2010-2020)
 Pa'am Beshavua with Tom Aharon (2018-2020)

 Italy 
 Striscia la notizia (1988–Present)
 Satyricon (2001)
 Fratelli di Crozza (2009–Present)
 Propaganda Live (2017–Present)

 Le Iene (–Present)

 Lithuania 
 Laikykitės ten su Andriumi Tapinu (2016–present)

 Lebanon 
 Chi.N.N Mexico 
 Chumel con Chumel, a fake news show broadcast by HBO.
 El chamuco tv, an interview show broadcast by TV UNAM.
 El diario de la noche, a late night show hosted by Víctor Trujillo and broadcast by TV Azteca.
 El mañanero, a satirical newscast hosted by Brozo the clown.
 El privilegio de mandar, a political telenovela broadcast by Televisa.
 Hechos de peluche, a satirical puppet segment in Hechos, and broadcast by TV Azteca.
 La caravana, a comedy show starred by Víctor Trujillo and Ausencio Cruz, and broadcast by Imevisión.
 Operación mamut (2021), an interview show broadcast by Canal Once.
 ¿Qué nos pasa?, a black comedy show produced by Héctor Suárez and broadcast by Televisa.

 Nepal 
 Whatver This is Nepal (2020–Present)

 Netherlands 
 PowNews (2010-2014)
 De Kwis (2013–2018)
 Zondag met Lubach (2014–2021)
 even tot hier (2019-heden)

 New Zealand 
 7 Days (2009–Present)
 The Project (2017 - Current)

 Pakistan 
 4 Man Show (2005-2013) 
 Banana News Network (2011-?,2013–Present)
 Mazaq Raat (2012–Present)
 Hasb-e-Haal Hum Sub Umeed Se Hain Khabarnaak (2010–Present)
 Media Azad Hai? The Real News (Pakistan) (2006-2007)

 Philippines 
 Sic O'Clock News (1987-1990)
 Wazzup Wazzup (2004-2007)
 May Tamang Balita (2011-2013)
 Kontrabando (stylized as KONTRABANDO) (2015-2017)

 Poland 
 Dziennik Telewizyjny (program rozrywkowy) (1995-2005)
 Szkło kontaktowe (2005-present)
 W tyle wizji (2016)

 Portugal 
 Contra-informação, a satirical latex puppet show
 5 Para A Meia-Noite (2009–present)

 Romania 
 Cronica Cârcotașilor (2000–Present)
 Bună, România! (2017–Present)
 Mondenii (2006–Present)
 Vacanța Mare (1999–Present)

 Russia 
 Kukly (1994-2002)
 Toon of Personality (2009-2013)
 Hobosti (2012-2017)

 Singapore 
 The Noose (2007–2016)

 Slovenia 
 Hribar Ta teden z Juretom Godlerjem Satirično oko South Africa 
 Late Nite News with Loyiso Gola (2010–Present)
 ZANEWS (1997–Present)

 Spain 
 El Informal (1998-2002)
 Las noticias del guiñol, a satirical latex puppet show
 El Intermedio (2006–Present)
 Txoko-Latex, Basque region

SwedenVeckans nyheter (2006-2007)Svenska nyheterSwitzerlandDeville Late Night (2016–present)

TaiwanEye Central Television (2015–present)博恩夜夜秀 (The Night Night Show), a satirical stand-up comedy that mostly focuses on politics (2018–present)

 Trinidad and Tobago 
 LateOClock NewsTurkey
 Heberler ZaytungUkraine
 Chisto News (2012–Present)
 Evening with Yanina Sokolova (2019–Present)

 United Kingdom 
 That Was The Week That Was (1962–1963)
 Yes Minister (1980-1988) known as Yes Prime Minister from 1986-1988
 Hot Metal (1986-1986)
 The New Statesman (1987-1992)
 Spitting Image (1984–1996, 2020-2021), the BritBox version of this satirical latex puppet show was an American co-production
 Drop the Dead Donkey (1990–1998)
 Have I Got News for You (1990–Present)
 The Day Today (1994)
 Brass Eye (1997–2001)
 Focus North (1999)
 Bremner, Bird and Fortune (1999–2010)
 2DTV (2001–2004)
 Broken News (2005)
 The Late Edition (2005–2008)
 Mock the Week (2005–2022)
 News Knight with Sir Trevor McDonald (2007) 

 The Last Leg (2012–Present) this started off as a satirical sports review show
 Unspun with Matt Forde (2016–2018)
 The Russell Howard Hour (2017-present) on Sky One, followed on from the success of Russell Howard's Good News (2009-2015) on BBC Three. 
 The Nightly Show (2017)
 Late Night Mash (2017–Present) previously known as The Mash Report when broadcast on BBC Two
 Frankie Boyle's New World Order (2017–Present)

 United States 
 The 1/2 Hour News Hour (2007)
 The Awful Truth (1999–2000)
 Chocolate News (2008)
 The Colbert Report (2005–2014)
 The Daily Show (1996–present)
 D.L. Hughley Breaks the News (2008–2009)
 Full Frontal with Samantha Bee (2016–2022)
 InfoMania (2007–2011)
 The Jim Jefferies Show (2017–2019)
 Last Week Tonight with John Oliver (2014–present)
 Late Night with Seth Meyers (2014–present)
 The Late Show with Stephen Colbert (2015–present)
 My Minute Minute (2015–present) 
 Nathan For You (2013–2017)
 Newsreaders (2013–2015)
 The Nightly Show with Larry Wilmore (2015–2016)
 Not Necessarily the News (1983–1990)
 Onion News Network (2011)
 Onion SportsDome (2011)
 The Opposition with Jordan Klepper (2017–2018)
 Real Time with Bill Maher (2003–present)
 Red Eye (TV series) (2007–2017)
 The Rundown with Robin Thede (2017–2018)
 SuperNews! (2005–2010)
 That Was The Week That Was (US) (1963–1965)
 Tooning Out the News (2020–present)
 Truth & Iliza'' (2017)

See also 

Satirical news
 News satire
 List of satirists and satires
 List of satirical magazines
 List of satirical news websites

Related topics
 Confirmation bias
 Court of public opinion
 Filter bubble
 Selective exposure theory
 Sensationalism
 Spiral of silence
 Trial by media

Satirical television news programs